Polypoetes nigribasalis is a moth of the family Notodontidae. It is found in Venezuela.

References

Moths described in 1925
Notodontidae of South America